Ellen Gerstein is an American actress, comedian, writer, producer, and director. She is known for her roles in television series such as The Whole Truth, Shameless, and Seinfeld, and films such as Venom and James Dean. She is also known for directing the award-winning short film Come Away with Me.

Education 
Gerstein has a graduate degree in Psychology, from Antioch University.

Career 
Gerstein spent six years working as a social worker in Manhattan.

One of Gerstein’s first roles was in the comedy film Coast to Coast, which was released in 1980.

Gerstein appeared in an episode of Seinfeld, titled “The Stake Out,” which first aired in 1990. Her other credits in the 1990s include Friends, the HBO television film Witch Hunt, Phyllis Nagy’s Girl Bar (play) in 1994, and the musical television film Annie in 1999.

Gerstein made her directorial debut with the short film Waiting for Ronald, which was released in 2003. The film went on to win the Award of Merit at the 2015 Best Shorts Competition and the Audience Choice Best Short Film award at the Method Fest Film Festival.

Gerstein starred in the play “A Tragedy on West Utica,” which was performed at the LA LUPA Fest One-Act Festival in 2011.

Gerstein’s credits in the 2010s include Liza on Demand, Shameless, Fresh Off the Boat, and The Morning Show.

Gerstein was set to star as one of the leads in the Pulitzer Prize-winning play ‘night, Mother in 2014, but was forced to drop out due to medical reasons. She remained on the project as a producer. 

At the 2015 Spotlight Short Film Awards, Gerstein received the Platinum Award for her short film Come Away with Me. She produced, directed, starred in, and wrote an original song for the project. She produced, directed, starred in, and wrote an original song for the project. She won the Best Director award at the 2015 Atlanta Shortsfest, the Platinum Remi award at Worldfest Houston, and the Best Short Film award at the 2016 Imagine This Women’s International Film Festival for her work on the film. The film was also nominated for Best Drama at the 2015 LAIFF Awards. It was also one of the short films shown at the 2016 Sonoma International Film Festival.

At the 2016 Cape May Film Festival, Gerstein received the Robert Prosky Character Actor Award.

Gerstein starred in the short film Passage, which was released in 2018. For her role in the film, she won the Best Supporting Actress award in the Featurette category at the 2018 Idyllwild International Festival of Cinema.

Gerstein appeared as Mrs. Manfredi in the 2018 film Venom, based on the Marvel Comics character of the same name. She also starred in the independent film Turnover, which was released in 2019.

Personal life 
In her spare time, Gerstein enjoys fostering and taking care of dogs. She is a member of the Alliance of Women Directors.

Filmography 
Film

Television

References 

American actresses
American directors
American film producers
American film actresses
20th-century American comedians
21st-century American comedians
Year of birth missing (living people)
Living people